Thierry Gadou (born 13 January 1969 in Vieux-Boucau-les-Bains) is a French basketball player formerly with Élan Béarnais Pau-Orthez. Gadou won a silver medal with the France national basketball team at the 2000 Summer Olympics.

References

1969 births
Living people
Sportspeople from Landes (department)
Basketball players at the 2000 Summer Olympics
Élan Béarnais players
French men's basketball players
French expatriate sportspeople in Spain
Liga ACB players
Olympic basketball players of France
Olympic medalists in basketball
Olympic silver medalists for France
Saski Baskonia players
Medalists at the 2000 Summer Olympics
Paris Racing Basket players